A candle clock is a thin candle with consistently spaced marking that, when burned, indicates the passage of periods of time. While no longer used today, candle clocks provided an effective way to tell time indoors, at night, or on a cloudy day.

History 
It is unknown where and when candle clocks were first used. The earliest reference to their use occurs in a Chinese poem by You Jiangu (AD 520). Here, the graduated candle supplied a means of determining time at night. Similar candles were used in Japan until the early 10th century.

You Jiangu's device consisted of six candles made from 72 pennyweights (24 grains each), of wax, each being 12 inches high, of uniform thickness, and divided into 12 sections each of one inch. Each candle burned away completely in four hours, making each marking 20 minutes. The candles were placed for protection inside cases made of a wooden frame with transparent horn panels in the sides. 

Similar methods of measuring time were used in medieval churches. The invention of the candle clock was attributed by the Anglo-Saxons to Alfred the Great, king of Wessex. The story of how the clock was created was narrated by Asser, who lived at Alfred's court and became his close associate. The candles were marked at intervals of an inch. Once lit, they were protected from the wind by being placed in a lantern made of wood and transparent horn. It would have taken 20 minutes to burn down to the next mark; the candles, burning one after the other, lasted for 24 hours.

Al-Jazari 

The most sophisticated candle clock known to date, however, was that of Al-Jazari in 1206. It included a dial to display the time and, for the first time, employed a bayonet fitting, a fastening mechanism still used in modern times. The English engineer and historian Donald Routledge Hill described one of al-Jazari's candle clocks as follows:

References

Sources
 
 Turner, Anthony J. The Time Museum, Volume I, Time Measuring Instruments; Part 3, Water-clocks, Sand-glasses, Fire-clocks

Candles
Chinese inventions
Clocks
Japanese inventions

ru:Огненные часы#Свечные часы